Juicy Love may refer to:
 Juicy Love (The Grace song)
 Juicy Love (Happiness song)